As of February 2016, there are 16 Conservation Areas in the borough of Warrington in Cheshire, England. The origins of Warrington are as a mediaeval market town and crossing point of the River Mersey, it grew rapidly during Industrial Revolution on the back of industries such as brewing, tanning and especially wire manufacturing. Further expansion followed the Second World War when it was selected as a New Town. The population is now over 200,000. Since 1971 several Conservation Areas have been designated in Warrington in recognition of their special architectural and historical interest.

Conservation areas

See also

List of conservation areas in England
Listed buildings in Warrington (unparished area)

References

Warrington
Warrington
Warrington